The 2016 Big Sky Conference women's basketball tournament was a tournament from March 7-12, 2016. This was the first year in which all Big Sky members competed in the conference tournament. All 12 teams met at the Reno Events Center for the right to advance to the 2016 NCAA tournament. The arena seats roughly 5,000. Idaho defeated Idaho State to win their 2nd Big Sky tournament title for the first time since 1985 before returning to the Big Sky in 2014 and earn an automatic trip to the NCAA women's tournament.

Format
Commissioner Doug Fullerton will announce the tournament format and dates later this year.

Seeds
Big Sky Tiebreaker procedures are as follows:
Head-to-head
Performance against conference teams in descending order to finish
Higher RPI
Coin Flip

* Overall record at end of regular season.

Schedule

Bracket

See also
2016 Big Sky Conference men's basketball tournament

References

2015–16 Big Sky Conference women's basketball season
Big Sky Conference women's basketball tournament
Basketball competitions in Reno, Nevada
College basketball tournaments in Nevada
Women's sports in Nevada
College sports tournaments in Nevada